Oreochima ellioti is an archaeomaenid ray-finned fish from Lower Jurassic-aged freshwater strata of Antarctica. Fossils come from the Lower Jurassic Carapace Formation (Pliensbachian-Toarcian) of Storm Peak, Antarctica, where a freshwater lake system once existed.  O. ellioti is also notable for being one of three archaeomaenid genera found outside of Australia.

Description 
Two nearly complete specimens of Oreochima ellioti (specimens AMNH 9910 and AMNH 9916) have an average total length of about 60 mm, with incomplete specimens represent individuals of similar size. The frontals taper anteriorly and were slightly notched where they were in contact with the nasals. The opercular bone was about twice as high as the subopercular.

Paleoenvironment 
The interbeds of the Kirkpatrick Basalt record sedimentary and biotic processes in relatively shallow lakes and ponds, and in surrounding wetlands to upland areas, with the biota of the lakes having access to magmatic sources. Hydrothermal activity help the development of microbes (Archaea) and helping the fauna on cooler events. Alongside Oreochima lived the spinicaudatan Carapacestheria disgregaris, notostracan branchiopods, ostracoda, insect nymphs and wings (mayflies, the stonefly nymph Uralonympha sehopfi and the dragonfly Caraphlebia antartica, and a Coleopteran), and plant leaves (Zamites).

See also 
 List of prehistoric bony fish genera

References

External links 
 

Early Jurassic fish
Fossil taxa described in 1972
Fossils of Antarctica
Prehistoric fish of Antarctica